Ledsham may refer to either of two places in England:

Ledsham, Cheshire
Ledsham, West Yorkshire